La niña de fuego (The fire girl) is a 1952 Argentine film.

Cast
 Lolita Torres – Fernanda / Fernando
 Ricardo Passano – Pocho
 Mario Baroffio – Cipriano Albaicín
 César Fiaschi – Pereda
 Domingo Márquez – Andrés
 Antonio Martelo
 Helena Cortesina
 Alfonso Pisano – Ramallo
 Arsenio Perdiguero – mr. José
  – Captain
 Delfy Miranda – Ofelia
 Noemí Laserre – María de los Cantares
 Arturo Arcari 	
 Semillita – box spectator
 Helena Cortesina – Clotilde
 Carlos Mendi – Marino
 Ofelia Cortesina
 Luis Laneri
 Dante Liguori

External links
 

1952 films
1952 musical films
1950s Spanish-language films
Argentine black-and-white films
Argentine musical films
1950s Argentine films